Kamala Pujari  is a  tribal woman from Koraput in Odisha, India. She is known for promoting organic farming. Interested in traditional farming, she learned the basic techniques from MS Swaminathan Research Foundation at Jeypore and has contributed a lot in the field of organic farming. She was awarded India's fourth highest civilian, the Padma Shri.

Biography
Kamala Pujari, a tribal lady of Patraput Village, 15 km from Jeypore, near Boipariguda, Koraput District, Odisha, has been preserving local paddies. Till now she has preserved hundreds of indigenous varieties of paddy. Conserving paddy and promoting organic farming is not a pastime for her. After getting into this, she mobilized people, arranged group gatherings, and interacted with people to shun chemical fertilizers. She called many people to join with her and knocked door to door from village to village. Her efforts were successful and farmers in Patraput village and neighboring villages gave up chemical fertilizers. Without having any basic education, Kamala has preserved 100 types of paddy to date. Ms Pujari has collected endangered and rare types of seeds such as paddy, turmeric, tili, black cumin, mahakanta, phula, and ghantia. She is also known for having persuaded villagers in her area to shun chemical fertilisers and adopt organic farming for better harvest and soil fertility. She is an inspiration for the upcoming generations.

Achievement
In 2002, Odisha University of Agriculture and Technology (OUAT) in Bhubaneswar was named after Kamala. She had won the Equator of Initiative Award in 2002 at Johannesburg.The Odisha government had honored her as the best woman farmer in 2004. She has also been awarded by the national award "Krusi Bisarada Samman" in New Delhi.

She holds the unique distinction of being the first tribal woman to be included in the list of members of the Odisha State Planning Board. She was made a member of the five-member team in March 2018 that makes a five-year plan for the state apart from providing short and long-term policy guidelines.

References

External links
Meet Kamala Pujari, a tribal agricultural activist and now a member of Odisha planning board; India Times

Indian activists
Indian farmers
Indian women activists
Indian women farmers
Year of birth missing (living people)
Living people
Recipients of the Padma Shri in other fields
Farmers' rights activists